Anguloclavus is a genus of sea snails, marine gastropod mollusks in the family Horaiclavidae.

Shuto (1983) created Anguloclavus as a subgenus of Horaiclavus for the species Horaiclavus (Anguloclavus) multicostatus (Schepman, 1913). Anguloclavus nevertheless has remained a taxon inquirendum.

Species
 Anguloclavus multicostatus (Schepman, 1913)

References

 SShuto T. (1983). New turrid taxa from Australian waters. Memoirs of the Faculty of Science, Kyushu University, series D, Geology. 25: 1-26, 2 pls.
  Bouchet, P.; Kantor, Y. I.; Sysoev, A.; Puillandre, N. (2011). A new operational classification of the Conoidea. Journal of Molluscan Studies. 77, 273-308
 Cernohorsky, Walter O. "Taxonomic notes on some deep-water Turridae (Mollusca: Gastropoda) from the Malagasy Republic." Records of the Auckland Institute and Museum (1987): 123-134.

 
Gastropod genera